Michael Echols is an American politician from the state of Louisiana. A Republican, he represents the 14th district in the Louisiana House of Representatives.

Background 
Echols is from Bastrop, Louisiana, and lives in Monroe. He earned a Bachelor of Arts and a Master of Business Administration from the University of Louisiana at Monroe. He served on the Monroe City Council before he was elected to the Louisiana House of Representatives in the 2019 elections.

References

External links

Living people
People from Bastrop, Louisiana
People from Monroe, Louisiana
University of Louisiana at Monroe alumni
Louisiana city council members
Republican Party members of the Louisiana House of Representatives
Year of birth missing (living people)